Engineering samples are the beta versions of integrated circuits that are meant to be used for compatibility qualification or as demonstrators. They are usually loaned to OEM manufacturers prior to the chip's commercial release to allow product development or display. 
Engineering samples are usually handed out under a non-disclosure agreement or another type of confidentiality agreement.

Some engineering samples, such as Pentium 4 processors were rare and favoured for having unlocked base-clock multipliers. More recently, Core 2 engineering samples have become more common and popular. Asian sellers were selling the Core 2 processors at major profit. Some engineering samples have been put through strenuous tests.

Engineering sample processors are also offered on a technical loan to some full-time employees at Intel, and are usually desktop extreme edition processors.

References

See also

Integrated circuits